James Fraser of Brea (1639–1699) was a Covenanter.

Early life
He was born in the parish of Kirkmichael, Ross-shire, on 29 July 1639. His father, Sir James Fraser, was the second son of Simon Fraser, 6th Lord Lovat, by his second wife, Jane Stewart, daughter of James Stewart, 1st Lord Doune. Sir James Fraser, a devout man, was elder for the presbytery of Inverness in the general assembly of 1638 which abolished episcopacy, and sat in several other general assemblies. 

James was educated at a grammar school, and suffered much from his father's financial difficulties. At the Siege of Inverness his father Sir James Fraser held Inverness Castle for the Covenanters of the Clan Fraser of Lovat against the royalist James Graham, 1st Marquess of Montrose.

In 1658 he graduated MA from Marischal College, Aberdeen and then began to study Law. However he abandoned his study of the law, and obtained license as a preacher of the gospel as a Presbyterian minister in 1672 by the presbytery of Moray.

Legal Problems
Coming under the notice of Archbishop Sharp as a preacher at conventicles, he was ordered to be apprehended in 1674; decreets and letters of inter-communing were passed against him 6 August 1675. He was summoned before the council 29 Jan. 1676–7, and ordered to be imprisoned on the Bass Rock the next day. He was escorted to the Bass by twelve horsemen and thirty foot. Here he remained two years and a half, being released on giving security for good behaviour in July 1679. He was depressed by the sudden death of his wife in October 1676, and by the many troubles of the time, as well as by his imprisonment. He yet found material for recording in his diary many matters that called for gratitude. While in prison he studied Hebrew and Greek, and gained some knowledge of oriental languages. He was released on payment of £560 in July 1679 by Sir Hugh Campbell of Cawdor.

He wrote also a treatise on justifying faith, of which many editions have been printed. Some of its views in favour of a universal reference in the work of Christ were strongly objected to by certain of his brethren who saw it in manuscript, and it was not till 1722 that the first part was published, the second appearing in 1749.

Second Imprisonment
In December 1681 he was again arrested and committed to Blackness Castle as a prisoner until he paid a fine of five thousand marks and gave security either to give up preaching or quit the kingdom. A brother-in-law caused the fine to be remitted, and Fraser was sent out of Scotland. On 21 July 1683 he was ordered to be imprisoned for six months in Newgate, London, for refusing the Oxford Oath. Before 6 July 1687 he returned to Scotland, and was living in the bounds of Lothian and Tweeddale. In 1689 he was minister of Culross, Fife, where he exercised his ministry with diligence and earnestness. He was a member of the assemblies of 1690 and 1692, had a call from Inverness in September 1696, but died in Edinburgh on 13 September 1699. The only graveyard available at this time was Greyfriars Kirkyard.

Theology
James Fraser is noted for a doctrine of universal atonement although he did not think that all would be saved. There was a Breach in the Reformed Presbyterian Church Synod in 1753 following the publication of the book A Treatise on Justifying Faith by James Fraser of Brea, who had written it while a prisoner on the Bass Rock. The Amyraldian view of the atonement was commended by a number of ministers who for a while set up their own Synod. The theology also caused no small commotion in the Antiburgher Church and Thomas Mair was ejected.

Personal life
He married (1) 31 July 1672, Isobel Gray (died October 1676), daughter of Sir William Gray of Pittendrum, and widow of William Hamilton, merchant, Edinburgh, and had issue — Jean Fraser (married, as his second wife, 1698, Hugh Bose of Kilravock), died without children; Beatrice (married William Burnet, minister of Falkirk) (2) Christian (died without children about 1696), daughter of John Inglis, minister of Hamilton, and widow of Alexander Carmichael, minister of Pettinain.

Bibliography
A Defence of the Convention of Estates (1689)
Prelacy an Idol, and Prelates Idolaters, a sermon (? Edinburgh, 1713 ; Glasgow, 1724)
Meditations on Several Subjects in Divinity (Edinburgh, 1721)
A Treatise concerning Justifying or Saving Faith, 2 vols. (Edinburgh, 1722–49)
Some Choice Select Meditations (Edinburgh, 1726 ; Glasgow, 1753) [edited by James Hog of Carnock]
Memoirs of the Life of Sir James Fraser of Brea, written by Himself (Edinburgh, 1738 ; Aberdeen, 1776 ; Glasgow, 1798; Aberdeen, 1843; Inverness, 1889) [with Introductory Note by Alexander Whyte, D.D., and Biographical Sketch by Gustavus Aird, D.D.] 
The Lawfulness and Duty of Separation from Corrupt Ministers and Churches Vindicated (Edinburgh, 1744). — [Edin. Bur. Reg. ; *Acts of Pari., ix., App. 22
Wodrow's Hist.
Wodrow's Analecta
Boston's Memoirs, 40 
Anderson's Bass Rock 
Family of Kilravock 
Walker's Theology and Theologians of Scotland
Edin. Christ. Instr., xxiii. 
Select Biog., ii. [Wodrow Soc] (Edinburgh, 1847) 
John Brown's The Christian, the Student, and Pastor (Edinburgh, 1781)
King's The Covenanters in the North, 375-90 
The Covenanters in Moray and Ross, 104 
Gen. Peg. Sas., lxiii., 186 
Whyte's James Fraser -, Laird of Brea (Edinburgh, 1911) See Also 
Elder Cumming's Holy Men of God 
Beveridge's Fife Bibliography, 148-9; Dictionary of National Biography

References

Attribution

1639 births
1699 deaths
Covenanters
17th-century Presbyterian ministers
Scottish prisoners and detainees
17th-century Calvinist and Reformed theologians
17th-century Scottish theologians
Covenanting Prisoners of the Bass Rock
17th-century Ministers of the Church of Scotland